Marcos Martínez Ucha (born 15 October 1985 in Madrid, Spain) is a professional racecar driver.

Career
Martínez competed in karting events from 1998 until 2002, when he entered Spanish Formula Junior. He would stay there with moderate success for three years, moving to Spanish Formula Three in 2005 with the team Racing Engineering and reaching the 2nd place in the B-Class. In 2006 he jumped to the A-Class, managing an outstanding victory in Cheste, Valencia. Meanwhile, he participated in three races in the Formula Renault 3.5 Series, where he managed to start fourth on the grid and run in second place in one of the races. In 2007, he began racing Spanish Formula Three with a new team, Novoteam. After 3 meetings and due to the results obtained he changed to Tec-Auto searching for an improvement in the championship.

He competed in the latter part of the 2007 GP2 Series season for the Racing Engineering team, alongside Javier Villa and replacing Ernesto Viso. However, he did not compete in the races of the first meeting in which he was entered, as he failed to lap within 107% of the pole position time after problems in qualifying.

He returned to the Formula Renault 3.5 Series full-time for 2008, driving for Pons Racing alongside compatriot Máximo Cortés, and will continue with the team in 2009. His season began with two wins at the Circuit de Catalunya in Montmeló. He followed that up with a third win in succession at Spa. He was the championship leader at the halfway stage, meaning that he was entitled to demonstrating a Renault Formula One car at the Silverstone meeting. He also added his fourth win of the season at that meeting. He did not score a point after that and slipped to seventh in the championship standings.

Racing record

Complete GP2 Series results
(key) (Races in bold indicate pole position) (Races in italics indicate fastest lap)

Complete Formula Renault 3.5 Series results
(key) (Races in bold indicate pole position) (Races in italics indicate fastest lap)

References

External links
Career statistics at driverdb.com

1985 births
Living people
Sportspeople from Madrid
Spanish racing drivers
GP2 Series drivers
Euroformula Open Championship drivers
Superleague Formula drivers
World Series Formula V8 3.5 drivers
Audi Sport TT Cup drivers
Pons Racing drivers
EuroInternational drivers
Racing Engineering drivers
De Villota Motorsport drivers